Yarovyi is a Ukrainian surname. It is a cognate of Russian Yarovoy. Notable people with the surname include:

 Maksym Yarovyi (born 1989), Ukrainian cross-country skier and biathlete
 Oleksandr Yarovyi (born 1999), Ukrainian Paralympic athlete
 Olexander Yarovyi, Dutch engineer

See also
 

Ukrainian-language surnames